Manuel da Costa may refer to:

 Manuel da Costa (bibliographer), Portuguese Jesuit and bibliographer
 Manuel da Costa (equestrian) (1946–2014), Portuguese Olympic equestrian
 Manuel da Costa (footballer, born 1986), Moroccan footballer
 Manuel da Costa (sport shooter) (1926–2020), Portuguese Olympic shooter
 Manuel da Costa (footballer, born 1916), Portuguese footballer